Ferguson High School (Sinhala: ෆර්ගසන් උසස් විද්‍යාලය) is a National School in Sri Lanka affiliated with the Sri Lanka Baptist Sangamaya located in Ratnapura District. School has two sections - the Primary section, which serves students from Grade 1 to Grade 5, and the Secondary section, which serves students from Grade 6 to Grade 13.

History 

1917 : Founded as a "Baptist Missionary English School" by the Baptist Missionary Society of British Ceylon. It was started with only three girls, in the premises of Baptist Church in Ratnapura.

1919 : The classroom was moved to the thatched-roofed spacious hall at the hilltop to accommodate the increasing number of 36 students.

1921 : The school was registered as a 'Grant-in-aid English School'

1924 : The school hostel was started.

1925 : Girl Guide Association was pioneered by C. Balasooriya.

1928 : The school known as Baptist Missionary English School was renamed as Ferguson High School in memory Mr. John Ferguson who helped the Baptist Missionary Society in Ceylon.

1932 : The system of school houses was introduced by the acting principal W. F. Gadge.

1933 : The Old Girls Association was initiated by Miss. Allsop.

1958 : School prize giving was held by the Chief guest Madam Sirimavo Bandaranayaka who was a former student of the school.

1960 : Became a Director Managed Government School and no longer a Christian assisted school

1993 : The school was recognized as a National school and 75th Birthday was celebrated with the participation of President Ranasinghe Premadasa

2010 : “Wisdom 2010” educational and Trade exhibition was held.

2017 : 100th anniversary of the school was celebrated with the participation President Maithripala Sirisena. A souvenir stamp was issued

School Crest 
Symbolic Representations

 Motto - Taken from "Idylls of the King" by Lord Tennyson
 Hills - 3 peaks seen from the school (Sri Padha and two attendant peaks)
 Double headed Eagle - High soaring free bird looking back with Thankfulness and looking forward with Hope
 CBC - Ceylon Baptist Council (Founders of School)
 Gems - School houses.
 Lamp - Intelligence
 Book - Knowledge

Drawn by Nalini Gunasekara, the art teacher of the school in 1953 and adopted unanimously

School song
Written by Venetia Stemba, with music by Consy Jayasekara

Houses 
Students are divided into four houses.

Sports 

 Athletics
 Chess
 Table Tennis
 Taekwondo

Clubs and extracurricular activities 

 Girl Guide Association
 Science Association

Principals

Notable alumni 
Past pupils of Ferguson High School Ratnapura are called Fergusonites. Following is a list of some notable alumni:

References

External links 

 

1917 establishments in Ceylon
Educational institutions established in 1917
National schools in Sri Lanka
Schools in Ratnapura